14 Mission is a trolleybus line operated by the San Francisco Municipal Railway. It serves Mission Street between the Ferry Plaza and Daly City.

Route description
The route runs almost entirely along Mission Street between the San Francisco Ferry Building Plaza and Mission and San Jose Streets in Daly City. Outbound buses run on Otis Street for the one-way segment of Mission near the Central Freeway. At  in length, the 14 Mission is Muni's longest trolleybus line.

The route operates 24 hours as part of the All Nighter network.

Mission Rapid
Limited-stop service is provided by the 14R Mission Rapid between 5th Street and Sickles Avenue/Acton Street in order to provide faster service through the corridor. The southern terminus is Daly City BART station. This service utilizes regular buses in order to allow passing of local services and due to lack of overhead line at the southern terminus.

Mission Express
A modified rush-hour route primarily operates on Mission Street, but runs express between Trumbull and 6th Streets, partially utilizing Interstate 280 and U.S. Route 101. This service utilizes regular buses due to lack of overhead line on the non-Mission segments.

History
Taking over from a previous horsecar operation, the Market Street Railway electrified streetcar line along Mission Boulevard opened on September 15, 1894. The service acquired the number 14 in 1908. The southern end of the line was largely rebuilt between 1935 and 1936. Also by the late 1930s, cars would continue further south to Tanforan Racetrack in San Bruno during the racing season. Streetcar service ended on January 15, 1949, with buses operating the route until 1952 when the line became a trolleybus service.

Bay Area Rapid Transit construction on Mission Street greatly disrupted 14 Mission operations throughout the late 1960s. San Francisco Municipal Transportation Agency installed bus lanes along Mission Street in 2016 to speed travel times for the 14 bus.

References

External links

 14 Mission — via SFMTA
 A lesson in American history riding the 14 Mission bus by Elaine Elinson

San Francisco Municipal Railway trolleybus routes
Railway lines opened in 1894
Railway lines closed in 1949
Public transportation in San Mateo County, California